Tarun Kumar Wahi is an Indian comic book artist and writer. He is the chief writer for Raj Comics and creator of the  superheros Doga, Parmanu, Bheriya and several others.

See also
 Comics Fest India

References

External links
 Wahi on Goodreads
 Wahi on IMDB

 
Living people
Indian comics artists
Indian comics
Superhero comics
Year of birth missing (living people)